is a 1974 Japanese police procedural film directed by Yoshitarō Nomura, based on the novel Suna no Utsuwa by Seicho Matsumoto.

Plot
Yoshitaro Nomura's 1974 film of Seicho Matsumoto's immensely popular detective story tells the tale of two detectives, Imanishi (Tetsuro Tamba) and Yoshimura (Kensaku Morita), tasked with tracking down the murderer of an old man, found bludgeoned to death in a rail yard. When the identity of the old man can't be determined, the investigation focuses on the only other clue: a scrap of conversation overheard at a bar between the old man and a younger one. A witness recalls the cryptic phrases "Kameda did this" and "Kameda doesn't change." 

This sets off a wide-ranging investigation that covers vast swaths of geography, changing social mores, and time. The investigation ends with an emotional and heartbreaking conclusion, all the more shattering because the reason for the crime need no longer exists in the world.

Cast
Tetsuro Tamba – Detective Eitaro Imanishi
Go Kato – Eiryo Waga/Hideo Motoura
Kensaku Morita – Detective Hiroshi Yoshimura
Yoko Shimada – Rieko Takagi
Karin Yamaguchi – Sachiko Tadokoro
Ken Ogata – Kenichi Miki
Seiji Matsuyama – Shokichi Miki
Yoshi Katō – Chiyokichi Motoura
Chishū Ryū – Kojuro Kirihara
Taketoshi Naito
Yoshio Inaba
Shin Saburi – Shigeyoshi Tadokoro

Awards
1975 Kinema Junpo Award
Best Screenplay (Shinobu Hashimoto and Yōji Yamada)
Readers' Choice Award
Best Japanese Film Director (Yoshitaro Nomura)
1975 Mainichi Film Concours
Best Director (Yoshitaro Nomura)
Best Film (Yoshitaro Nomura)
Best Film Score (Kosuke Sugano )
Best Screenplay (Shinobu Hashimoto and Yōji Yamada)
9th Moscow International Film Festival
Diploma (Yoshitaro Nomura)
Nominated for Golden Prize (Yoshitaro Nomura).

References

External links
 
 

1970s crime thriller films
1970s mystery films
1974 films
Films based on Japanese novels
Films directed by Yoshitaro Nomura
1970s Japanese-language films
Procedural films
Shochiku films
Works originally published in Japanese newspapers
Films with screenplays by Shinobu Hashimoto
Films with screenplays by Yôji Yamada
Films set in Ishikawa Prefecture
Films set in Tokyo
Films set in Akita Prefecture
Films set in Yamanashi Prefecture
Films set in Osaka
Films set in Shimane Prefecture
Films set in 1971
1970s Japanese films
Works about leprosy